Affect logic or affect-logic is a biopsychosocial notion, introduced in 1988 by Swiss psychiatrist Luc Ciompi, relating to Soteria psychiatric treatment, which sheds light on the interaction between thinking and feeling. It holds that affect and cognition, or feeling and thinking, are continually interacting with the other activity in the cortical network. Ciompi developed this theoretical account for the purpose of understanding the psychological disorder known as schizophrenia.

Ciompi's notion of affect-logic was criticized in some subsequent reviews for being not testable and, as a result, atheoretical.

In sociology, the concept is used for understanding extremist mentalities and for a critique of the sociological systems theory of Niklas Luhmann.

References

External links 
 Introduction into the Concept of Affect-Logic

Psychotherapy